Dębowo may refer to:

Dębowo, Brodnica County in Kuyavian-Pomeranian Voivodeship (north-central Poland)
Dębowo, Świecie County in Kuyavian-Pomeranian Voivodeship (north-central Poland)
Dębowo, Nakło County in Kuyavian-Pomeranian Voivodeship (north-central Poland)
Dębowo, Augustów County in Podlaskie Voivodeship (north-east Poland)
Dębowo, Bielsk County in Podlaskie Voivodeship (north-east Poland)
Dębowo, Łomża County in Podlaskie Voivodeship (north-east Poland)
Dębowo, Suwałki County in Podlaskie Voivodeship (north-east Poland)
Dębowo, Ciechanów County in Masovian Voivodeship (east-central Poland)
Dębowo, Sierpc County in Masovian Voivodeship (east-central Poland)
Dębowo, Lubusz Voivodeship (west Poland)
Dębowo, Bytów County in Pomeranian Voivodeship (north Poland)
Dębowo, Kartuzy County in Pomeranian Voivodeship (north Poland)
Dębowo, Warmian-Masurian Voivodeship (north Poland)
Dębowo, West Pomeranian Voivodeship (north-west Poland)